The Marley Neck Rosenwald School is a historic school building located at 7780 Solley Road in Glen Burnie, Maryland. The school was built in 1927 with design and funding assistance from the Rosenwald Fund, and served the area's African-American students. Out of the original twenty three built, it is one of the ten surviving Rosenwald schools in the county.

The building was listed on the National Register of Historic Places in 2005. It was used as a church hall then.

Starting around 2008, the building became a community center, intended to offer after-school programs, health care screening, tutoring, and other social services and activities.

See also
National Register of Historic Places in Anne Arundel County, Maryland

External links
 Marley Neck School at The Historical Marker Database, marked by Anne Arundel County Trust for Preservation

References

Rosenwald schools in Maryland
School buildings on the National Register of Historic Places in Maryland
School buildings completed in 1927
Buildings and structures in Anne Arundel County, Maryland
National Register of Historic Places in Anne Arundel County, Maryland
1927 establishments in Maryland